Harold Sidney Innocent (18 April 1933 – 12 September 1993) was an English actor who appeared in many film and television roles.

After attending Broad Street Secondary Modern School in Coventry, Innocent worked for a short time as an office clerk. Realising quickly that he was not suited to this career, he turned instead to acting, studying at the Birmingham School of Speech Training and Dramatic Art. After National Service in the RAF, Innocent went into repertory theatre. Later he moved to Hollywood where he appeared in Alfred Hitchcock Presents in 1959, as well other television series such as The Barbara Stanwyck Show.

On his return to the United Kingdom he appeared at the Nottingham Playhouse, the Royal Lyceum Theatre in Edinburgh, the Young Vic, the National Theatre, the Royal Shakespeare Company and the Bristol Old Vic. In 1984 with the RSC he appeared in Richard III and Love's Labour's Lost. With the same company he appeared in Henry V, playing both the Archbishop of Canterbury and the Duke of Burgundy. He played the latter role in the 1989 film version for Kenneth Branagh. In 1991 he appeared in Alan Bennett's The Madness of George III, again at the National Theatre.

Innocent's television appearances include the 1969 pilot episode of Randall and Hopkirk (Deceased), The Persuaders!, My Late Lamented Friend and Partner as well as Callan, Crown Court, The Professionals, Minder, Inspector Morse, the Bursar in Porterhouse Blue,  EastEnders and as Lord Robert "Bunchy" Gospell in episode 6 ("Death in a White Tie") of the Inspector Alleyn Mysteries.  Maigret and the Mad Woman, as Pepito Giovanni. In Porterhouse Blue (1987) he appeared alongside David Jason as the college Burser.  His appeared singing comic monologues and songs alongside Cilla Black in The Green Tie on the Little Yellow Dog, which was recorded 1982, and broadcast by Channel 4 in 1983.

His film roles included Loot (1970), Brazil (1984), Henry V (1989) and Robin Hood: Prince of Thieves (1991). On stage he appeared in a musical version of Alice in Wonderland at the Lyric Theatre in Hammersmith in 1986, and made his operatic debut in Gilbert and Sullivan's Ruddigore for a centenary performance in 1987 at Sadler's Wells.

He appeared in the Doctor Who serial The Happiness Patrol as Gilbert M, and later the BBC Radio 5 drama serial The Paradise of Death.

He died in London in 1993 after a short illness, aged 60.

Filmography

References

External links
 
 
 

1933 births
1993 deaths
English male film actors
English male television actors
Actors from Coventry
Alumni of Birmingham City University
20th-century English male actors